The fourth season of Cougar Town, an American sitcom that airs on TBS, began airing on January 8, 2013. Season four regular cast members include Courteney Cox, Christa Miller, Busy Philipps, Brian Van Holt, Dan Byrd, Ian Gomez, and Josh Hopkins. The sitcom was created by Bill Lawrence and Kevin Biegel. This is the first season to air on TBS.

Production
On May 10, 2012, it was announced that Cougar Town would move from ABC to TBS, for its fourth season. The network also airs repeats of the ABC telecasts in a weekday post-midnight time slot. Bill Lawrence and Kevin Biegel have stepped down as showrunners, while Ric Swartzlander took over the role of showrunner during season four. However, Lawrence and Biegel remain as executive producers and consultants.

Casting
It was announced in November 2012 that Shirley Jones will guest as Anne, one half of a couple that agrees to purchase Grayson's former house under the condition that they be welcomed into the Cul-de-Sac Crew. Tippi Hedren will guest star as herself in the season finale, as the group attempts to cheer up Jules' father by tracking down one of his favorite movie stars.

Reception
The fourth season of Cougar Town received generally positive reviews from critics. The season currently holds an average score of 65 out of 100 on Metacritic, based on 7 reviews, indicating 'generally favorable reviews'.

Episodes

Ratings

U.S. Nielsen ratings

References

General references 
 
 

2013 American television seasons
Cougar Town seasons